Brian Clark (born 1 March 1988 in Dundee) is a Scottish footballer, or soccer-player, who plays as a midfielder.

He started his career with Dundee, but was released in 2008, after making less than 10 league appearances, and scoring one goal. He was loaned out to Arbroath in the first part of the 2007–08 season. After his release by Dundee, Clark appeared for Montrose as a trialist in a friendly match during July 2008 against Dundee. Clark eventually signed for junior side Carnoustie Panmure.

References

External links

1988 births
Arbroath F.C. players
Association football midfielders
Carnoustie Panmure F.C. players
Dundee F.C. players
Living people
Montrose F.C. players
Scottish Football League players
Scottish footballers
Footballers from Dundee